Images of Heaven may refer to:

 Images of Heaven (EP), a 1982 EP by Peter Godwin
 Images of Heaven: The Best of Peter Godwin, 1998